Til (also Romanized as Tīl) is a village in Palanga Rural District, Shahrud District, Khalkhal County, Ardabil Province, Iran. At the 2006 census, its population was 928, in 221 families.

References 

Towns and villages in Khalkhal County